Charles Wolcott Balestier (December 13, 1861 – December 6, 1891) was a promising American writer, editor, and publisher who died young, and is now remembered primarily for his connection to Rudyard Kipling.

Edmund Gosse wrote of Balestier that he had never met anyone "who had anything like his power of marshaling before his memory, in due order, all the militant English writers of the moment, small as well as great." In Balestier's obituary in the New York Times, William Dean Howells states that he knew him quite well and that "Mr. Balestier would have achieved great fame had he lived a few more years."

Selected works
 A Common Story (story), The Century Magazine
 A Patent Philter (story), 1884
 A Fair Device, 1884
 James G. Blaine: A Sketch of His Life, R. Worthington, 1884
 A Victorious Defeat, 1886  
 The Naulahka: A Story of West and East, with Rudyard Kipling, 1892
 Benefits Forgot, 1892

References

External links
 

1861 births
1891 deaths
Writers from Rochester, New York
Rudyard Kipling
American male novelists
American male poets
American poets
19th-century American novelists
19th-century male writers
Deaths from typhoid fever
American people of Martiniquais descent
Infectious disease deaths in Germany
American expatriates in Germany
University of Virginia alumni
Cornell University alumni